The discography of Weather Report, an influential American jazz band with a career lasting sixteen years between 1970 and 1986, consists of fourteen studio albums, three live albums, eleven compilation albums, five singles, one B-side, and six video albums.

Weather Report's self-titled debut album Weather Report, released in 1971, caused a sensation in the jazz world and is still considered a classic of early fusion.  It was awarded Album of the Year by Down Beat magazine's polls that year.  In 1972 Weather Report released its second album, I Sing the Body Electric.  The first side featured new studio recordings, while the second side was taken from live recordings of a concert in Tokyo, Japan.  On 1973's Sweetnighter, Weather Report began to take a new more funk and groove-oriented direction.

Breakout album Mysterious Traveller, released in 1974, was the second of Weather Report's albums to win Down Beat "Album of the Year" award.  Released in 1975, Tale Spinnin' was Weather Report's most solid album to date.  It won the Down Beat best album award for 1975.

By 1976's Black Market album, Weather Report's music had evolved further from open-ended funk jams into more melody and rock-oriented and concise forms.  It continued Weather Report's ongoing run of success, selling well and being the fourth of the band's albums to win Down Beat album of the year award.  The band's next album was 1977's acclaimed Heavy Weather, which proved to be the band's most successful recording. It would dominate Weather Report's disc awards, including their last Down Beat "Album of the Year" award.

By 1978 the band released its eighth album, Mr. Gone.  The album rose to No. 1 on the Billboard Jazz Albums  chart.
  The 1979 double live album 8:30, recorded on the Mr Gone tour, won that year's Grammy Award for Best Jazz Fusion Performance.  Weather Report's ninth studio album, Night Passage, was released in 1980, and its second eponymous release following the 1970 debut album was recorded in 1981 and released in 1982.

In 1983, the band released its eleventh studio album Procession, which showed the band returning to the "world music".  It was praised by Down Beat for its "unity and joy" and it has come to be seen as one of the best Weather Report albums.  Weather Report then recorded Domino Theory and Live in Japan in 1984, Sportin' Life in 1985, and the finale album This Is This! in 1986.  By February 1986, Shorter left the band, and Zawinul dissolved the band in 1987.

Many video, compilation and live albums were released after the breakup of the band.  Live and Unreleased was made available in 2002.  In September 2006 Columbia/Legacy released a Weather Report box set, Forecast: Tomorrow.  A DVD video of the 1976 Montreux Jazz Festival performance has become available as well.  Columbia/Legacy have also re-released the 1984 Live in Japan concert on DVD.

Studio albums

Live albums

Compilations

Singles

B-sides 
 1990: "The Groove" (by Rodney Franklin) / "Birdland" (12") Old Gold (2) 1990

Videography

Tribute albums

Unofficial releases 
 1971: Live in Vienna, November 1971 (LP)
 1971: Berlin, September 3, 1971 (with Eje Thelin, Alan Skidmore, and John Surman) (LP)
 1974: Solarization's (LP)
 1978: In a Silent Phoenix (LP)
 1978: Live Weather (LP)
 1980: Hammersmith Affair (LP)
 1980: Live Passage (LP)
 1980: Paris Live 1980 (LP)
 1981: At The Opera House 1981 (LP)
 1998: Milky Way SELL 1140 (CD)
 2000: Paris Live 1980, Vol. 1 Gemini (CD)

References

External links 

 [ Weather Report Discography] at Allmusic
 Weather Report Discography at Discogs
 Weather Report Discography at Rate Your Music
Weather Report: The Annotated Discography
THE DOZENS: WEATHER REPORT by Jared Pauley at Jazz.com
Essential Jaco: with Weather Report at JacoPastorius.com

Discographies of American artists
Jazz discographies